Alexander Cheesman (born 17 October 1988 in London) is an English rugby player who currently plays for Cornish Pirates and formerly played for London Wasps.

References

External links
 Cornish Pirates profile

1988 births
Living people
Cornish Pirates players
English rugby union players
Oxford University RFC players
Rugby union players from Hammersmith
Wasps RFC players
Rugby union flankers